The Constituent Assembly of Mexico City (Asamblea Constituyente de la Ciudad de México) is a body formed to create a new constitution for Mexico City in the wake of the 2016 political reforms that convert Mexico City into a federative entity comparable to the 31 states; with "autonomy in all matters concerning its internal regime and its political and administrative organization." It will be installed on September 15, 2016, and must create the new constitution by January 31, 2017.

The Constituent Assembly is based at the Casona de Xicoténcatl, the former home of the Senate of the Republic, under an agreement between the government of Mexico City and the Senate.

Composition
The Constituent Assembly consists of 100 members, which were allocated as follows in the decree of political reform of Mexico City published on January 29, 2016 in the Diario Oficial de la Federación:

60 members, chosen in elections organized by the National Electoral Institute, using party list proportional representation
14 senators, selected by a two-thirds vote of the Senate of the Republic
14 deputies, selected by a two-thirds vote of the Chamber of Deputies
6 members designated by the president (Enrique Peña Nieto)
6 members designated by the Chief of the Government of the Federal District (Miguel Ángel Mancera)

Elected members
The elections for 60 of the 100 seats in the Constituent Assembly were held on June 5, 2016. The 100 members are as follows:

Senatorial designees
Institutional Revolutionary Party (PRI)
Raúl Cervantes Andrade
María Lorena Marín Moreno
Enrique Burgos García
Lisbeth Hernández Lecona
Joel Ayala Almeida
Yolanda de la Torre Valdez
National Action Party (PAN)
Roberto Gil Zuarth
Mariana Gómez del Campo
Ernesto Cordero Arroyo
Gabriela Cuevas Barrón
Juan Carlos Romero Hicks
Party of the Democratic Revolution (PRD)
Dolores Padierna Luna
Armando Ríos Piter
Ecologist Green Party of Mexico (PVEM)
Carlos Alberto Puente Salas

Deputy designees
Institutional Revolutionary Party (PRI)
María de La Paz Quiñones Cornejo
Enrique Jackson
María Esther de Jesús Scherman Leaño
César Camacho Quiroz
National Action Party (PAN)
Federico Döring Casar

Santiago Taboada Cortina
Party of the Democratic Revolution (PRD)
Cecilia Guadalupe Soto González
Jesús Salvador Valencia Guzmán
Ecologist Green Party of Mexico (PVEM)
Jesús Sesma Suárez
Citizens' Movement (MC)

New Alliance Party (PANAL)
María Eugenia Ocampo Bedolla
Social Encounter Party (PES)
Hugo Eric Flores Cervantes
Morena
To be designated

Presidential designees
Claudia Aguilar Barroso
Manuel Enrique Díaz Infante
Augusto Gómez Villanueva (President of the Constituent Assembly)
Fernando Lerdo de Tejada
María Beatriz Pagés Llergo Rebollar
Claudia Pastor Bobadilla

Mayoral designees
Olga Sánchez Cordero
Claudia Jusidman
Ana Laura Magaloni
Alejandro Chanona
Porfirio Muñoz Ledo
Alejandro Encinas

Final composition

The winning independent candidate — the only one of 21 to pass the 32,000-vote threshold — was Ismael Figueroa Flores.

Party coordinators
Bernardo Bátiz, Morena
Santiago Creel, PAN

Notes

References

External links
Constituent Assembly website

2016 establishments in Mexico
Mexico City